Her Name Was Christa is an American horror film written by, directed by, and starring James L. Edwards. The plot of the film follows a lonely middle aged man who falls in love with a prostitute and is faced with a horrific choice after their arrangement takes a turn for the worse. The film stars Shianne Daye, James L. Edwards, and Drew Fortier.

Cast 
 Shianne Daye as Christa Sullivan
 James L. Edwards as Stephen Booth
 Drew Fortier as Nick Perkins
 Rick Jermain as Blaze
 Kaylee Williams as Raven

Production 
Shooting took place over 18 non consecutive days between September 2017 and November 2018. A long hiatus took place during the middle of production due to the original actress set to portray Christa pulling out of the project citing creative differences over the graphic nature of the content in the film.

Release 
The film was released on February 14, 2020 on Blu-ray, DVD, and digital streaming.

Reception 
Reviews for the film were positive with Pophorror.com calling it "Both Brutally Honest And Strangely Comforting".

Horrornews.net concluded that, "Her Name Was Christa is nothing short of amazing. While I’m not certain I would call it a horror movie it is a twisted love story that contains horror elements as well as its share of disturbing and shocking scenes. I haven’t had a film impact me this much since I saw the likes of Make-out with Violence, The Dead Girl, and Megan Is Missing. Even though I loved this film I felt the need to check out some cartoons after I watched it just so I felt a little better."

Myindieproductions.com stated that, "With Her Name Was Christa, James manages to deliver an effective gut-punch and give us an eerie spin on the festering, debilitating affects of loneliness and loss."

References

External links 
 

2020 films
2020 horror films
American romantic horror films
American psychological horror films
2020s English-language films